Andrzej Pliśz (March 17, 1929 – November 28, 1991) was a Polish mathematician, specializing in differential equations and optimal control theory.

Education and career
Pliś received his undergraduate degree from the Jagiellonian University, where he studied from 1947 to 1951. He received his PhD from the Mathematical Institute of the Polish Academy of Sciences, where his thesis advisor was Tadeusz Ważewski. Pliś did research and taught at both the Jagiellonian University and the Mathematical Institute of the Polish Academy of Sciences. He was promoted in 1961 to associate professor and in 1966 to full professor. In 1961 he was elected a member of the Polish Academy of Sciences. In 1962 he was an Invited Speaker at the International Congress of Mathematicians in Stockholm.

Pliś published about 60 research papers. Perhaps his two most famous papers are The problem of uniqueness for the solution of a system of partial differential equations (1954) and A smooth linear elliptic differential equation without any solution in a sphere (1961). His paper Characteristics of nonlinear partial differential equations (1954) gave an elegant solution to an unsolved problem which Alfréd Haar worked on in 1929. Another noteworthy paper by Pliś is On a topological method for studying the behaviour of the integrals of ordinary differential equations (1954).

Selected publications

References

1929 births
1991 deaths
20th-century Polish mathematicians
Jagiellonian University alumni
Academic staff of Jagiellonian University
PDE theorists
Members of the Polish Academy of Sciences